Mycena urania, commonly known as the violet bonnet, is a species of mushroom in the family Mycenaceae. First named Agaricua uranius in 1818 by Swedish mycologist Elias Magnus Fries, it was assigned its current name in 1872 by the French naturalist Lucien Quélet.

Description
The cap is initially conic in shape, and expands to hemispheric in maturity, typically reaching  in diameter.

Distribution
A rare species, the North American distribution of Mycena urania includes Michigan, North Carolina, and Tennessee. It has also been collected in the Scottish Cairngorms.

References

urania
Fungi of Europe
Fungi of North America
Taxa named by Elias Magnus Fries